Goražde is a city and the administrative center of Bosnian-Podrinje Canton Goražde of the Federation of Bosnia and Herzegovina, an entity of Bosnia and Herzegovina. It is situated on the banks of Drina river. As of 2013, the municipality has a population of 20,897 inhabitants and the city 11,806.

Location
Goražde is situated on the banks of the River Drina in South East Bosnia. The settlement is situated on the alluvial terrace in a broad valley, formed by the erosion of the River Drina. The valley is bordered on the South-East by Biserna, on the South by Samari, on the South-West by Misjak, on the West by Gubavica and on the North by Povrsnica.

The River Drina flows between these and some other hills. Its valley, which, since ancient times it has been part of the route going from the sea to the mainland (Dubrovnik–Trebinje–Gacko–Foča–the Drina valley), is the principal traffic artery in the south-eastern region of Bosnia. At Goražde this road meets another coming from Sarajevo and central Bosnia via the Jabuka Mountain pass down to the Drina valley and preceding on to Plevlje.

History

Medieval period

With Gornje Podrinje, Goražde was part of the old Serbian State up to 1376, when it was attached to the Bosnian State under the reign of King Tvrtko. After Tvrtko's death the town was ruled by the Hum Dukes among whom the best known was Herzog Stjepan Vukčić Kosača.

In 1379, Goražde was first mentioned as a trading settlement and in 1444 as a fortress. The origin of the town's name seems to have come from the Slavonic word "gorazd".

The Goražde market became well known in 1415 when merchants from Dubrovnik had intensive commercial relations with it.

Ottoman rule
The Ottomans took Goražde over definitively in 1465 and the place assumed oriental features. In 1477 there were four mahals in town. From 1550–1557 Mehmed-paša Sokolović built a stone bridge across the Drina and a caravanserai.

During the Turkish rule Goražde was a significant trading centre, being at the crossroads of the two important roads: the Bosnian and the Dubrovnik. The gross state income from land amounted in 1477 to 24,256 akchi. In 1711 Goražde was mentioned as the Turkish zoimat of 26,000 akchi.

Two mosques built by the Sijerčić begs date back to the 18th century. Near Goražde stands the Eastern Orthodox Church of Saint George, built in 1454 by Stefan Vukčić Kosača for his wife. The Goražde printing house, attached to the church, worked there from 1519 to 1521. This was the first printing house to be established in Bosnia and Herzegovina and the second in the Balkans.

The decline of Goražde in the 18th century and the first half of the 19th century is attributed, among other things, to the plague. Up to the middle of the 19th century Goražde was part of the Herzegovinian Sandjak, when it became part of the Sarajevo Sandjak.

Austrian rule

The period of the Austro-Hungarian occupation was marked by the decline of Goražde, although there was at the same time a certain ascent. Due to its geographical position on the border Goražde was during World War I one of the main strongholds of Austria-Hungary used against Serbia and Montenegro.

Yugoslavia
In pre-war Yugoslavia Goražde, being no more a frontier town, had normal conditions under which to develop and prosper.

In 1941 German troops entered the town after an air-raid on April 17. Later on Italian troops were also stationed there.

The National Liberation Army took over the town for the first time on January 27, 1942, and remained there until May of the same year. During this period National Liberation Committees were formed for the town the district of Goražde on the basis of the Foča Stipulations. At the same time Goražde was the headquarters of the National Liberation Army for East Bosnia. Early in March, 1942 the Commander-in-Chief, Marshal Tito stayed in Goražde. Goražde was liberated twice more, in 1943 and 1944, and on March 6, 1945 it was finally liberated from the occupation.

Chetnik massacres against ethnic Croats and Bosniaks in December 1941–January 1942 caused the death of approximately 2,050 civilians.

The composition of the Goražde population can be traced from the times of Austro-Hungarian occupation. The Orthodox inhabitants originate from Stari Vlah in Sandzak, Brda in Montenegro, Herzegovina and South Serbia. The few ancestral inhabitants exempted, the Muslim population began to come in great numbers to Goražde and its surroundings in the 17th century.

From the end of the war till 1961 a considerable number of new groups of families came to live in Goražde from the neighbouring villages and from some other far away places, having been attracted by the economic growth of Goražde. According to the census of 1961 Goražde had 8,812 inhabitants.

Before World War II the industry of Goražde comprised mainly retail trade and in some measure wholesale trade, the catering industry, handicraft, transport. During the occupation, 1941–1945, industry was destroyed and about 45% of the existing houses as well.

Since then Goražde's industry has been systematically developing, its main branches being manufacturing, building, transport, trade and crafts. In 1981 Gorazde's GDP per capita was 70% of the Yugoslav average.

After the II World War a new period, marked by a tremendous social and economic rise began. A number of new industrial enterprises have been founded, among which the most significant is the Nitrogen Factory.

Bosnian War

From 1992 to 1995 during the Bosnian War, Goražde was one of six Bosniak enclaves, along with Srebrenica and Žepa, surrounded and besieged by the Bosnian Serb Army. In April 1993 it was made into a United Nations Safe Area in which the United Nations was supposed to deter attacks on the civilian population. Between March 30 and April 23, 1994, the Serbs launched a major offensive against the town. After air strikes against Serb tanks and outposts and a NATO ultimatum, Serbian forces agreed to withdraw their artillery and armored vehicles  from the town. In 1995 it was again targeted by the Bosnian Serbs, who ignored the ultimatum and launched an attack on UN guard posts. Around 350 UN servicemen were taken hostage but the remaining men from the Royal Welch Fusiliers who were already stationed there and reinforcement Bosniak troops prevented the Bosnian Serbs from taking over the town. It avoided the fate of Srebrenica, where the Bosnian Serbs continued on to after the failed attempt.

After the negotiation of the Dayton accords, a land corridor was established between Goražde and the Federation.

Settlements

 Ahmovići
 Baćci
 Bahovo
 Berić
 Bakije
 Bare
 Bašabulići
 Batkovići
 Bezmilje
 Biljin
 Blagojevići
 Bogdanići
 Bogušići
 Borak Brdo
 Borova
 Borovići
 Bošanje
 Boškovići
 Brajlovići
 Bratiš
 Brekovi
 Brezje
 Brijeg
 Bučje
 Budići
 Butkovići
 Butkovići Ilovača
 Crvica
 Čitluk
 Čovčići
 Čurovi
 Ćatovići
 Ćehajići
 Deševa
 Donja Brda
 Donja Bukvica
 Donje Selo
 Donji Bogovići
 Dragolji
 Dragovići
 Dučići
 Džindići
 Džuha
 Đakovići
 Faočići
 Gaj
 Glamoč
 Gočela
 Gojčevići
 Goražde
 Gornja Brda
 Gornja Bukvica
 Gornji Bogovići
 Grabovik
 Gradac
 Gunjačići
 Gunjevići
 Gusići
 Guskovići
 Hadžići
 Hajradinovići
 Hladila
 Hrančići
 Hrid
 Hrušanj
 Hubjeri
 Ilino
 Ilovača
 Jabuka
 Jagodići
 Jarovići
 Kalac
 Kamen
 Kanlići
 Karauzovići
 Karovići
 Kazagići
 Knjevići
 Kodžaga Polje
 Kola
 Kolijevke
 Kolovarice
 Konjbaba
 Konjevići
 Kosače
 Kostenik
 Kovači
 Kraboriš
 Krašići
 Kreča
 Kučine
 Kušeši
 Kutješi
 Laleta
 Lukarice
 Ljeskovik
 Markovići
 Mašići
 Milanovići
 Mirvići
 Mirvići na Podhranjenu
 Morinac
 Mravi
 Mravinjac
 Mrkovi
 Nekopi
 Nevorići
 Novakovići
 Odžak
 Orahovice
 Oručevac
 Osanica
 Osječani
 Ostružno
 Ozrenovići
 Paraun
 Perjani
 Pijestina
 Pijevac
 Plesi
 Podhomara
 Podhranjen
 Podkozara Donja
 Podkozara Gornja
 Podmeljine
 Poratak
 Potrkuša
 Pribjenovići
 Prisoje
 Prolaz
 Pršeši
 Radići
 Radijevići
 Radmilovići
 Radovovići
 Raškovići
 Ratkovići
 Rešetnica
 Ropovići
 Rosijevići
 Rusanj
 Sedlari
 Seoca
 Sijedac
 Skravnik
 Slatina
 Sofići
 Sopotnica
 Spahovići
 Surovi
 Šabanci
 Šašići
 Šehovići
 Šemihova
 Šovšići
 Šućurići
 Trebeševo
 Tupačići
 Uhotići
 Ušanovići
 Ustiprača
 Utješinovići
 Vitkovići
 Vlahovići
 Vlajčići
 Vraneši
 Vranići
 Vranpotok
 Vrbica
 Vremci
 Vučetići
 Zabus
 Zakalje
 Zapljevac
 Završje
 Zemegresi
 Zidine
 Zorlaci
 Zorovići
 Zubovići
 Zubovići u Oglečevi
 Zupčići
 Žigovi
 Žilići
 Žitovo
 Živojevići
 Žuželo

Demographics

Population

Ethnic composition

Environment

Natural environment
The surrounding region of Goražde is composed of Paleozoic slate, sandstone, carbon and perm. The hills are for the most part rounded and with gentle slopes. The higher ones are composed of limestone. Goražde with its surroundings has mainly equable and fresh mountainous climate. The average annual temperature of the air is 10.8 C and the rainfall is fairly evenly distributed throughout the year. The town is supplied with water from six springs. One part of the inhabitants gets drinking water from ordinary wells. The construction of a water supply system began in 1962. from the spring in Cajnice,  from Goražde.

The River Drina has great significance for the founding and the development of Goražde.

The greatest floods recorded since the 18th century occurred in 1677, 1731, 1737, 1896, 1911, 1922, 1952, 1974 and 2010.

Built environment

The main characteristic of the layout and the type of town is its elongated shape along the Ustipraca–Foča road. From 1465 till 1878 Goražde was part of the Ottoman Empire. In the 18th and 19th centuries Goražde was inhabited by Muslim and Orthodox communities. Up to World War II there existed two separate parts: Muslim and Orthodox. Today this division is disappearing. After World War II the town began to expand and be modernized, New streets have been built, public and residential buildings have been built in the centre and in the outskirts as well. From 1945 to 1961, 1130 council flats and 680 private homes have been built. In 1961 there were 616 buildings altogether in the town.

Climate

In literature
The 1992–1995 siege of Goražde is the subject of several books, two of which are available in English; both underline the mixture of brutality and humanity that punctuated the era. Savo Heleta's Not My Turn to Die is written by a survivor who was a Serb-Bosnian teenager whose family was at once under fire from the Serb bombardments and under suspicion as Serbs in the mostly Bosniak town. Safe Area Gorazde is a graphic novel by Joe Sacco, a reporter who visited the besieged town several times during the period.

Another book that is centred heavily on Goražde is No Escape Zone authored by Nick Richardson. Richardson is a former Fleet Air Arm pilot who was shot down in the region of Goražde on a NATO bombing mission. He spent several weeks inside the city and tells of the conditions and daily shelling residents and UN forces faced.

Sports
Local football club FK Goražde play in the second tier-First League of the Federation of Bosnia and Herzegovina and host their games at the Stadion Midhat Drljević.

Twin towns – sister cities

Goražde is twinned with:

 Adapazarı, Turkey
 Delčevo, North Macedonia
 Gaziemir, Turkey
 Gera, Germany
 Güngören, Turkey
 Karatay, Turkey
 Keçiören, Turkey
 Maragheh, Iran
 Şahinbey, Turkey
 Stari Grad (Sarajevo), Bosnia and Herzegovina

Notable people
Admir Raščić, footballer
János Vitéz, Danubian humanist, Cardinal Archbishop of Esztergom, Primate of Hungary and Bishop of Várad (1445–1465)
Isak Samokovlija, writer
Miroslav Radović, footballer
Anabela Atijas, singer
Kasim Kamenica, handball player and coach
Džejla Ramović, singer 
Husein Đozo, Islamic theologian 
Stjepan Vukčić Kosača, last King of Bosnia
 Rade Jovanović, folksong collector and composer
 Elvir Laković Laka, singer

See also
Safe Area Goražde
Drina Martyrs

References

External links

 Official Website 
 Goražde Community portal 
 Goražde Info website

 
Populated places in Goražde